The Wells & Fakenham Railway, was the northern part of the Wymondham to Wells branch in Norfolk, England. It connected the market town of Fakenham to the coast at Wells-next-the-Sea. It closed to passenger traffic in 1964 and to goods traffic in the 1980s.

Construction

The Norfolk Railway opened a line from Wymondham to Dereham, on the Norwich to Thetford mainline, in 1847, and a line from Dereham to Fakenham in 1849. The Wells and Fakenham Railway, incorporated in 1854, was formed by local landowners and some directors of the Norfolk Railway. The  Fakenham to Wells line opened in 1857 and a short branch to Wells Harbour was built in 1859. The line became part of the Great Eastern Railway in 1862.

The line used diesel multiple units for passenger traffic from 1955. It was listed for closure in the Beeching Report and closed to passengers on 5 October 1964. Goods services continued until the 1980s.

The route today
Part of the route has been reopened as the Wells and Walsingham Light Railway. A section of trackbed from Walsingham railway station southwards to the village of Houghton Saint Giles is used as a public footpath called the Pilgrims' Way.

References

Further reading

Closed railway lines in the East of England
Rail transport in Norfolk
Wells-next-the-Sea
Walsingham
Railway lines opened in 1857